Kipsang is a surname of Kenyan origin meaning "son of Sang" that may refer to:

Emmanuel Kipsang (born 1991), Kenyan long-distance track runner
Geoffrey Kipsang (born 1992), Kenyan cross country and half marathon runner
Hillary Kipsang Yego (born 1992), Kenyan steeplechase runner
James Kipsang Kwambai (born 1983), Kenyan marathon runner and 2006 Beijing Marathon winner
John Korir Kipsang (born 1975), Kenyan road runner competing mainly in the United States
Salim Kipsang (born 1979), Kenyan marathon runner and 2009 Tokyo Marathon winner
William Kipsang (born 1977), Kenyan marathon runner and 2008 Rotterdam Marathon winner
Wilson Kipsang Kiprotich (born 1982), Kenyan marathon runner and 2012 Olympic medallist
Kipsang - Musician, Musician
 Abel Kipsang (born 1996), Kenyan middle-distance runner

Kalenjin names